Prince Rupert Airport  is an airport located  west southwest of Prince Rupert, British Columbia, Canada.

The airport is classified as an airport of entry by Nav Canada and is staffed by the Canada Border Services Agency (CBSA). CBSA officers at this airport can handle general aviation aircraft only, with no more than 50 passengers.

The airport is located on Digby Island, which is only accessible by ferry from the city of Prince Rupert. The passenger ferry fare is included in airline tickets.

Airline and destination

Air cargo carriers and destinations

See also
 List of airports in the Prince Rupert area

References

External links

Certified airports in British Columbia
Transport in Prince Rupert, British Columbia